Oconto County is a county  in the U.S. state of Wisconsin. As of the 2020 census, the population was 38,965.  Its county seat is Oconto. The county was established in 1851.

Oconto County is part of the Green Bay, WI Metropolitan Statistical Area and the Green Bay-Shawano, WI Combined Statistical Area.

History
First visited by French explorers in the 17th century, Oconto County is among the oldest settlements in Wisconsin. Father Claude-Jean Allouez of the Roman Catholic Jesuit order said the first Mass in Oconto. Among the first settlers was Joseph Tourtilott, who explored much of the Oconto River watershed. Oconto County was created in 1851 and organized in 1854.

Geography

Adjacent counties
 Marinette County - northeast
 Door County - southeast, border is in Green Bay
 Brown County - south
 Shawano County - southwest
 Menominee County - west
 Langlade County - west
 Forest County - northwest

Major highways
  U.S. Highway 41
  U.S. Highway 141
  Highway 22 (Wisconsin)
  Highway 32 (Wisconsin)
  Highway 64 (Wisconsin)

Railroads
Canadian National
Escanaba and Lake Superior Railroad

Buses
List of intercity bus stops in Wisconsin

Airport
J. Douglas Bake Memorial Airport (KOCQ) serves the county and surrounding communities.

National protected area
 Nicolet National Forest (part)

Demographics

2020 census
As of the census of 2020, the population was 38,965. The racial makeup of the county was 93.5% White, 1.3% Native American, 0.3% Asian, 0.2% Black or African American, 0.8% from other races, and 3.8% from two or more races. Ethnically, the population was 2.2% Hispanic or Latino of any race.

2000 census
As of the census of 2000, there were 35,634 people, 13,979 households, and 10,050 families residing in the county. The population density was 36 people per square mile (14/km2). There were 19,812 housing units at an average density of 20 per square mile (8/km2). The racial makeup of the county was 97.76% White, 0.13% Black or African American, 0.78% Native American, 0.20% Asian, 0.01% Pacific Islander, 0.24% from other races, and 0.88% from two or more races.  0.67% of the population were Hispanic or Latino of any race. 42.9% were of German, 11.8% Polish, 6.0% French and 5.6% American ancestry.

There were 13,979 households, out of which 32.20% had children under the age of 18 living with them, 60.70% were married couples living together, 6.90% had a female householder with no husband present, and 28.10% were non-families. 23.50% of all households were made up of individuals, and 10.70% had someone living alone who was 65 years of age or older. The average household size was 2.52 and the average family size was 2.97.

In the county, the population was spread out, with 25.70% under the age of 18, 6.40% from 18 to 24, 28.70% from 25 to 44, 24.00% from 45 to 64, and 15.10% who were 65 years of age or older. The median age was 39 years. For every 100 females, there were 101.30 males. For every 100 females age 18 and over, there were 99.70 males.

In 2017, there were 353 births, giving a general fertility rate of 61.0 births per 1000 women aged 15–44, the 28th lowest rate out of all 72 Wisconsin counties. Additionally, there were 14 reported induced abortions performed on women of Oconto County residence in 2017.

Communities

Cities
 Gillett
 Oconto (county seat)
 Oconto Falls

Villages
 Lena
 Pulaski (mostly in Brown County and Shawano County)
 Suring

Towns

 Abrams
 Bagley
 Brazeau
 Breed
 Chase
 Doty
 Gillett
 How
 Lakewood
 Lena
 Little River
 Little Suamico
 Maple Valley
 Morgan
 Mountain
 Oconto Falls
 Oconto
 Pensaukee
 Riverview
 Spruce
 Stiles
 Townsend
 Underhill

Census-designated places
 Abrams
 Lakewood
 Mountain
 Sobieski
 Townsend

Unincorporated communities

 Bonita
 Breed
 Brookside
 Chase
 County Line (partial)
 Cullen
 Frostville
 Hayes
 Hickory Corners
 Hintz
 Kelly Brook
 Klondike
 Little Suamico
 Logan
 Morgan
 Mosling
 Oak Orchard
 Pensaukee
 Sampson
 Sobieski Corners
 South Chase
 Spruce
 Stiles
 Stiles Junction
 Underhill

Native American community
 Forest County Potawatomi Community

Ghost town/neighborhood
 Leighton

Politics
In the latter half of the 20th century and the early 21st century, Oconto County was a bellwether in presidential elections, supporting the winning candidate in every election from 1964 to 2008. In 2012, however, the county voted for Republican Mitt Romney despite Romney losing the state of Wisconsin and the national election. In 2016, the county swung 27 percentage points to the right, giving Republican Donald Trump a margin of victory of more than 37 percentage points and a vote share of 66%. In 2020, Trump improved his performance, carrying Oconto by a margin of 41 percentage points and winning 69.9% of the vote to Democrat Joe Biden's 28.9%. This was the best result for any presidential nominee in Oconto County since 1920, when Warren Harding received 78.2% of the vote, and remains the third strongest performance of any candidate ever.

See also
 National Register of Historic Places listings in Oconto County, Wisconsin

References

Further reading
 Hall, Richard L. The Centennial History of Oconto County. 1876.
 Henry, William Benjamin. The History of Oconto County. Madison, Wis.: University of Wisconsin-Madison, 1921.

External links

 Oconto County
 Oconto County map from the Wisconsin Department of Transportation
 Oconto County Tourism & Development

 
Green Bay metropolitan area
1854 establishments in Wisconsin
Populated places established in 1854